Marion Historic District may refer to:
 Marion Courthouse Square Historic District, Marion, Alabama
 Marion Historic District (Cheshire and Southington, Connecticut)
 Marion Downtown Commercial Historic District, Marion, Indiana
 Marion Historic District (Marion, South Carolina)
 Marion Street Area Historic District, Rock Hill, South Carolina
 Marion Historic District (Marion, Virginia)

See also
 West Marion Historic District, Marion, Alabama